Lee Roberts (June 17, 1913 – April 24, 1989) was a film actor during the Hollywood Golden Age. Sometimes he is credited as Robert Allen or Lee J. Roberts.

Career
Little is known about this man who appeared in over 100 films between 1943 and 1959, according to the Internet Movie Database. Roberts, whose career of portraying good guys and bad guys spanned virtually the entire range of Columbia and Republic  serials production, delighted serial fans as the classic action heavy, but he could play sympathetic roles with equal skills as a sheriff or a police detective. Then, after the westerns and serials faded he migrated to television work, appearing in a significant number of popular TV shows.

Selected appearances

Films
 The Law Comes to Gunsight (1947)
 Wild Country (1947)
 Lady at Midnight (1948)
 Mark of the Lash (1948)
 Deadline (1948)
 South of Death Valley (1949)
 Battling Marshal (1950)
 Lawless Cowboys (1951)
 The Longhorn (1951)
 Kansas Territory (1952)
 The Spoilers (1955)
 The Spirit of St. Louis (1957)
 Gunfight at the O.K. Corral (1957)
 Missile to the Moon (1958)

Serials
 The Masked Marvel (1943)
 The Scarlet Horseman (1946)
 Batman and Robin (1949)
 Pirates of the High Seas (1950)
 Desperadoes of the West (1950)
 Desperadoes of the West (1950)
 Captain Video: Master of the Stratosphere (1951)
 King of the Congo (1952)
 The Great Adventures of Captain Kidd (1953)
 The Lost Planet (1953)
 Gunfighters of the Northwest (1954)
 Riding with Buffalo Bill (1954)
 The Adventures of Captain Africa (1955)
 King of the Carnival (1955)
 Perils of the Wilderness (1956)
 Blazing the Overland Trail (1956)

TV shows
 The Lone Ranger (1949–1956) - Stage Driver / Stage Guard / Sheriff Casey / Sheriff Mason / Messenger / Deputy Alex Creel
 The Cisco Kid (1950–1954) - Jim / Henchman Augie / Link Barton / Assayer / Lacey / Henchman Matt Collins / Olson
 The Adventures of Kit Carson (1952) - Deputy Morgan / Henchman / Henchman Jess
 The Roy Rogers Show (1952) - Deputy Phil / John Medford
 Hopalong Cassidy (1952–1954) - Leeds - Henchman / Dillon
 Topper (1954) - Martin
 Letter to Loretta (1954) - Court Attendant
 Dragnet (1955)
 Commando Cody: Sky Marshal of the Universe (1955) - Orton / Alien Crewman
 The Adventures of Rin Tin Tin (1955–1958) - Sgt. Spike Duffy / Aaron Depew / Al Cross / Travis
 The Gabby Hayes Show (1956)
 Tombstone Territory (1957–1959) - Eric Erickson / Howie
 Casey Jones (1957) - Sergeant McGinnis
 Perry Mason (1958) - Detective Ron Jacks
 Broken Arrow (1958) - Major Spillman
 Frontier Doctor (1958) - Cowboy
 The Rough Riders (1958–1959)
 Mackenzie's Raiders (1959) - Rancher / Assassin
 Man with a Camera (1959) - Officer

External links

American male film actors
American male television actors
1913 births
1989 deaths
20th-century American male actors